Juntos Otra Vez  ("Together Again") is a compilation album released by Mexican grupero bands Los Bukis and Los Yonic's in 1989.

Track listing

References

External links
Fan website
Los Yonic's on Batanga.com
Juntos Otra Vez on amazon.com
[ Juntos Otra Vez on allmusic.com]

Los Bukis compilation albums
Fonovisa Records compilation albums
1989 compilation albums